SHL is a brand of Polish motorcycles, produced from 1938 until 1970 by Huta Ludwików, later KZWM Polmo-SHL in Kielce (small parties were made in the WFM in Warsaw).

Pre-war
The Huta Ludwików (Ludwików Ironworks), founded in 1919 in Kielce, at first produced hardware and agricultural machines. From 1938 it started production of a motorcycle of its own design, using 98 cm³ British Villiers engines (parts of the engines were locally manufactured). The motorcycle was named SHL 98 - SHL being short for Suchedniowska Huta Ludwików (Ludwików Ironworks of Suchedniów, as the works were initially owned by a foundry in Suchedniów). Fewer than 1,000 motorcycles were manufactured before the outbreak of World War II in 1939 and the German occupation.

Postwar - the beginnings
After the war the looted works were nationalized and it was decided to continue with motorcycle production. The first postwar model SHL 125 – M02 of 1947 was a mix of pre-war parts and frames and the German DKW RT 125 design, using a copy of the RT125 engine, produced by PZL Psie Pole in Wrocław. A small series of 203 motorcycles was manufactured in State Automobile Workshops Nr.2 in Warsaw (later WFM works) and was similar to Sokół 125 of the same works.

The first model to be produced in Kielce again was improved SHL M03 of 1948, and then SHL M04 of 1949. In 1948 the name Huta Ludwików was changed to KZWM Polmo-SHL (Kieleckie Zakłady Wyrobów Metalowych - Kielce Metal Works). Luckily, the communist authorities decided to keep pre-war SHL brand, which was not a rule. In 1951 it was however decided to stop motorcycle production in Kielce and until 1954, the production of SHL M04 was continued in the WFM in Warsaw, followed by a short series of SHL M05 in 1955, with telescopic front suspension. All these motorcycles were improvements of one design, related to the DKW RT 125, with 125 cc engines. Some 18,500 motorcycles had been made in Kielce so far. Then, the SHL brand disappeared for a short time, replaced by the WFM brand.

Production summit
After the end of Stalinist period, from 1958, the KZWM in Kielce returned to motorcycle production. The new model was SHL M06U, which was an improved version of the WFM M06, more luxurious and fitted with 150 ccm engine. By 1959, 10,356 were made, followed by 27,370 of improved model M06T, with improved front suspension.

Most popular model became the SHL M11 – some 180,000 made in 1961–1968. It was a new model, although being a development of the M06T, powered by 175 ccm engine. In spite of its rather limited capacity, it was the second Polish motorcycle at that time, as regards to the capacity and power, after the Junak. Some M11s were exported, even to the US, and in 1962 the Escorts group  bought a licence to manufacture this model in India, under a brand Rajdoot. According to some information, it became a staple of Indian rural milkmen and its licence production lasted until 2005.

The M11 was followed by an SHL M17 Gazela (gazelle), with stronger 175 ccm engine and attractive-looking fairings. Some 50,000 were made in 1968–1970. Unfortunately, it was the last model with the SHL badge, since the authorities decided, this time ultimately, to stop motorcycle production in Kielce and leave the WSK PZL-Świdnik as the only Polish motorcycle manufacturer.

Bibliography 
Notes

References

 - Total pages: 160 
 
 

Motorcycle manufacturers of Poland
Polish brands
Kielce